The Berkeley Heights Public Schools are a comprehensive community public school district serving students in pre-Kindergarten through twelfth grade from Berkeley Heights in Union County, New Jersey.

As of the 2020–21 school year, the district, comprised of six schools, had an enrollment of 2,499 students and 230.2 classroom teachers (on an FTE basis), for a student–teacher ratio of 10.9:1.

The district is classified by the New Jersey Department of Education as being in District Factor Group "I", the second-highest of eight groupings. District Factor Groups organize districts statewide to allow comparison by common socioeconomic characteristics of the local districts. From lowest socioeconomic status to highest, the categories are A, B, CD, DE, FG, GH, I and J.

The district's high school serves public school students of Berkeley Heights, along with approximately 300 students from neighboring Borough of Mountainside who are educated at the high school as part of a sending/receiving relationship with the Mountainside School District that is covered by an agreement that runs through the end of 2021-22 school year. Governor Livingston provides programs for deaf, hard of hearing and cognitively-impaired students in the district and those who are enrolled from all over north-central New Jersey who attend on a tuition basis.

Schools

Schools in the district (with 2020–21 enrollment data from the National Center for Education Statistics) are:
Early childhood
Mary Kay McMillin Early Childhood Center with 304 students in PreK-2 grade
Anne Corley-Hand, Principal
William Woodruff Elementary School with 180 students in grades K-2
Brenda Marley, Principal
Elementary school
Thomas P. Hughes Elementary School with 264 students in grades 3-5
Jessica Nardi, Principal
Mountain Park Elementary School with 243 students in grades 3-5
Jon Morisseau, Principal
Middle school
Columbia Middle School with 544 students in grades 6-8
Paul Kobliska, Principal
High school
Governor Livingston High School with 960 students in grades 9-12
Robert Nixon, Principal

Administration
Core members of the district's administration are:
Dr. Melissa Varley, Superintendent
Julie Kot, Business Administrator / Board Secretary

Board of education
The district's board of education is comprised of seven members who set policy and oversee the fiscal and educational operation of the district through its administration. As a Type II school district, the board's trustees are elected directly by voters to serve three-year terms of office on a staggered basis, with three seats up for election each year held (since 2012) as part of the November general election; a representative appointed by Mountainside also sits on the board. The board appoints a superintendent to oversee the district's day-to-day operations and a business administrator to supervise the business functions of the district.

The board of education and administrative offices for the district are located in the original Columbia School building on Plainfield Avenue, adjacent to the middle school building.

References

External links
Berkeley Heights Public Schools

Data for the Berkeley Heights Public Schools, National Center for Education Statistics

Berkeley Heights, New Jersey
New Jersey District Factor Group I
School districts in Union County, New Jersey